Tyack or Tyacke is a Cornish surname. It is an ancient surname and the Tyacks were landowners at an early period. It is thought to be derived from a Celtic word for ploughman. William Tyack was escheator of the Leeward Islands in the reign of James II. The Tyackes of St Breock bore the arms: Arg. a fesse (or a chevron) between three bears' heads couped Sa.

Other bearers of the name:
Dave Tyack, German musician
David Tyack, American academic, Professor of Education
Major General David Tyacke, British Army officer
Jim Tyack, baseball player 
Les Tyack, Australian politician
Ryan Tyack, Australian archer 
Sarah Tyacke, British historian of cartography

Footnotes

Logan TYACK